Ilex pauciflora is a species of plant in the family Aquifoliaceae. It is a tree endemic to Peninsular Malaysia. It is threatened by habitat loss.

Taxonomy
The specific epithet pauciflora is Latin for 'few-flowered'.

References

pauciflora
Endemic flora of Peninsular Malaysia
Trees of Peninsular Malaysia
Endangered plants
Taxonomy articles created by Polbot